NME Presents: The Essential Bands 2006 is a 2-disc CD released by Universal Music TV on November 13, 2006, featuring popular artists of the year. On some versions of the CD, The Fratellis is misspelled as The Fratelliss.

Track listing

Disc 1
"When You Were Young" (3:39) - The Killers
"America" (4:10) - Razorlight
"Monster" (3:42) - The Automatic
"Chelsea Dagger" (3:34) - The Fratellis
"When the Sun Goes Down" (3:34) - Arctic Monkeys
"Bang Bang, You're Dead" (3:32) - Dirty Pretty Things
"Lonely at the Top" (3:09) - The Ordinary Boys
"Suzie" (3:13) - Boy Kill Boy
"You Can Have It All" (Ian Brodie Remix) (4:21) - Kaiser Chiefs
"The Fallen" (3:42) - Franz Ferdinand
"Gold Lion" (3:06) - Yeah Yeah Yeahs
"Lost and Found" (2:55) - Feeder
"22 Grand Job" (1:46) - The Rakes
"X-Ray" (3:21) - The Maccabees
"Make Her Cry" (2:51) - The Marshals
"Get Myself Into It" (3:40) - The Rapture
"Ice Cream" (3:08) - New Young Pony Club
"London Bridge" (3:25) - Dogs
"Woman" (2:55) - Wolfmother
"House Party at Boothy's" (3:27) - Little Man Tate

Disc 2
"Chasing Cars" (4:26) - Snow Patrol
"Is It Any Wonder?" (3:05) - Keane
"She Moves in Her Own Way" (2:49) - The Kooks
"Trains to Brazil" (3:44) - Guillemots
"Harrowdown Hill" (4:38) - Thom Yorke
"Blackened Blue Eyes" (4:20) - The Charlatans
"Albion" (5:25) - Babyshambles
"Nature's Law" (4:08) - Embrace
"So Here We Are" (3:50) - Bloc Party
"When the Night Feels My Song" (3:08) - Bedouin Soundclash
"Accident & Emergency" (3:16) - Patrick Wolf
"Young Folks" (4:38) - Peter Bjorn and John
"Ticket to Immortality" (3:59) - The Dears
"Rocky Took a Lover" (4:09) - Bell X1
"1" (2:35) -Joy Zipper
"Writer's Block" (3:41) - Just Jack
"You're Gonna Lose Us" (2:35) - The Cribs
"Send in the Boys" (2:45) - Milburn
"Sea of Trouble" (3:32) - Cord
"Elusive" (3:41) - Scott Matthews

References

Compilation albums included with magazines
2006 compilation albums
New Musical Express
2006 in British music